The 2008 Copa Colombia, officially the 2008 Copa Postobón for sponsorship reasons, was the sixth edition of the Copa Colombia, the football tournament for professional clubs in Colombia. This edition marked the return of the tournament after a 19-year absence. It began on March 12 and ended on November 19.

Bogotá club La Equidad beat Manizales club Once Caldas in the finals for their first Copa Colombia title.

Format
The competition is divided into 5 stages. The first stage is a group stage. The groups will be comprised by teams from the same regions, six teams per group. The top-two teams from each group will advance to the a second stage. The second stage will comprise six matches, each contested by two teams. The six winners advance to the third stage, which is identical to the second stage. The three winners and the best second place team advance to the semifinals. The winner of the semifinals advance to the finals. The winner of the Copa Colombia will earn a berth in the 2009 Copa Sudamericana.

Phase I 
This is the system of groups approved for the making of the tournament.

Group A
Teams from Caribbean region.

Group B 
Teams from Antioquia and Risaralda.

Group C 
Teams from the northeastern part of Colombia.

Group D 
Teams from Bogotá and Villavicencio.

Group E 
Teams from Pacific Region of Colombia.

Grupo F 
Teams from Central-Western part of the country .

Phase II 
Phase II began on August 27 and ended on September 3.

|}

Phase III 
Phase III began on September 17 and ended on October 1.

|}

Semifinals 
The semifinals were played on October 29 and November 5

|}

Finals 
The Finals were played on November 12 and November 19.

|}

See also
 Copa Colombia

References
1.Itagüí Ditaires changed their name from Bajo Cauca half-way through the 2008 season.

References

External links 
 Official website of DIMAYOR 
 Copa Colombia on RSSSF

2008
Copa
Colombia